The 301 Squadron "Jaguares" (Esquadra 301) is a fighter squadron of the Portuguese Air Force (PoAF).

Roles and missions
The 301 Squadron has the mission of executing operations of air defense and conventional attack in all-weather conditions.

 Operations of air defense in all-weather conditions
 Air defense operations (DCA)
 Offensive counter air operations (OCA)
 Air defense in support of maritime operations (Defense TASMO)
 Operations of conventional attack in all-weather conditions
 Anti-surface air operations (ASFAO)
 Anti-air combat operations (CA)

History
Activated with the designation 301 Squadron in 1978, the origins of the "Jaguares" squadron dates back to the former Portuguese Air Force squadrons that operated the Fiat G-91 Gina between 1965 and 1993. During the Portuguese Colonial War these squadrons executed more than 13,000 operational missions, with five aircraft having been shot down by anti-aircraft artillery (AAA) and surface-to-air missiles (SAM).

In August 1974, in the post-revolution period, the transfer of the Fiat G-91 aircraft from Air Base 5, in Monte Real, and of all air bases in the Portuguese African colonies to Air Base 6, in Montijo was initiated. The 62 Squadron was then created to operate the Fiat G-91.

With the reorganization of the Air Force's aerial units, in 1978, the squadron's designation was changed to 301 Squadron, thus assigning as its primary mission the execution of operations of close air support (CAS), air interdiction (IA) and tactical air reconnaissance, as well as its secondary mission the execution of actions of tactical air support for maritime operations (TASMO) and of air defense operations (DCA).

On June 27, 1993, with the last flight of the Fiat G-91 in service with the Portuguese Air Force, and the subsequent retirement of this aircraft, as well the recent restructuring of the PoAF, the 301 Squadron was transferred to Air Base 11, in Beja, having been equipped with the ground-attack aircraft Alpha Jet A. This aircraft's first flight was conducted on October 6, 1993, by of Major Lopes da Silva.

During the joint exercise COMAO (Composite Air Operations), on September 5, 2005, the 301 Squadron reached the 20,000 flight hours with its Alpha Jet fleet. Shortly after, on November 20, 2005, the "Jaguares" conducted their last operation flight with the Alpha Jet.

On November 25, 2005, the 301 Squadron was transferred to Air Base 5, in Monte Real, and equipped with the modernized F-16 MLU, being the first flight squadron of the Portuguese Air Force to operate exclusive this version of the fighter.

Aircraft
 Fiat G-91 R4 (1978–1993)
 Dassault/Dornier Alpha Jet A (1993–2005)
 F-16 Fighting Falcon AM/BM (2005–present)

Achievements
 Distinctive Services Gold Medal (Medalha de Ouro de Serviços Distintos) (April 19, 1988)
 Silver Tiger 1980, 1985 and 2011 trophy

Deployments
 Operation Baltic Air Policing (November 1, 2007 – December 15, 2007)The 301 Squadron participated in the patrol of the skies of the Baltic states (Lithuania, Estonia and Latvia) with two F-16 AM along with four F-16 A block 15 of 201 Squadron.
 Icelandic Air Policing (August 7, 2012 – September 20, 2012)Provided air defense of Iceland's airspace along with fighters from 201 Squadron.

Exercises
 NATO Tiger Meet
 Guest squadron (1978)
 Host (1987)
 Host (1996)
 Host (2002)
 Host (2020)
 "Dinamic Mix"
 1997, Italy
 1998, Turkey
 2000, Greece
 "Central Enterprise", Germany (1999)
 "Polygonne", Germany (1999)
 "Linked Seas 2000", Ovar (2000)
 "EOLO", Spain (2000)
 Real Thaw (2009–2021)

See also
 Portuguese Air Force
 List of F-16 Fighting Falcon operators
 201 Squadron
 121 Squadron
 502 Squadron
 702 Squadron
 93 Squadron
 62 Squadron

External links
 301 Squadron information at the Portuguese Air Force official website
 Esquadra 301 – Jaguares, official website 
 PoAF participation in the Baltic Air Policing '07, PoAF official website dedicated to the operation
 PoAF 301st esquadra, squadron information at F-16.net
 301 Squadron profile, NATO Tiger Association
 List of commanders of the 301 Squadron 

Portuguese Air Force aircraft squadrons
Military of Portugal